Union Township is a township in Worth County, Iowa, USA.

History
Union Township was established in 1863.

References

Townships in Worth County, Iowa
Townships in Iowa